The Archduke Albrecht March is an Austro-Hungarian military march, composed by Karel Komzák II (also known as Karl Komzák) as his opus 136. It was named in honour of Archduke Albrecht, Duke of Teschen (1817–1895).

The march was used extensively by the German forces in World War I and World War II, especially during the departures and arrivals of U-boats. The march is also used by the Chilean Navy during military parades or marches.

Introduction

In popular culture

The march is played in the film The Miracle of Bern when a train of released German prisoners of war arrives at Essen.

References

Austrian military marches
Articles containing video clips